Tomochika is both a masculine Japanese given name and a Japanese surname.

Possible writings
Tomochika can be written using different combinations of kanji characters. Here are some examples:

友親, "friend, parent"
友近, "friend, near"
友約, "friend, agreement"
友盟, "friend, alliance"
友誓, "friend, pledge"
知親, "know, parent"
知近, "know, near"
知約, "know, agreement"
知盟, "know, alliance"
知誓, "know, pledge"
智親, "intellect, parent"
智近, "intellect, near"
智約, "intellect, agreement"
智盟, "intellect, alliance"
共親, "together, parent"
共近, "together, near"
朋親, "companion, parent"
朋近, "companion, near"
朝親, "morning/dynasty, parent"
朝近, "morning/dynasty, near"
朝約, "morning/dynasty, agreement"
朝盟, "morning/dynasty, alliance"

The name can also be written in hiragana ともちか or katakana トモチカ.

Notable people with the given name Tomochika
, Japanese manga artist
, Japanese Go player
, Japanese baseball player

Notable people with the surname Tomochika
 (born 1975), Japanese footballer and politician

Japanese-language surnames
Japanese masculine given names